Encantamento is the third album by Portuguese fado singer Mafalda Arnauth, released in 2003 on EMI Valentim de Carvalho.

Track listing
 Pode Lá Ser
 As Fontes
 Porque Não Oiço No Ar 
 Fado Arnauth
 Ó Voz Da Minh’Alma
 Cavalo À Solta
 Eu Venho
 Trova Escondida
 Canção
 Da Palma Da Minha Mão
 Sem Limite
 No Teu Poema
 É Sempre Cedo
 Bendito Fado, Bendita Gente

Personnel
Mafalda Arnauth - production
José Elmiro Nunes - Portuguese guitar
Luís Oliveira - arrangement, direction, fado guitar
João Penedo - double bass

References

2003 albums
Mafalda Arnauth albums